Kish otaman (also known as  of the Zaporizhian Host) was a chief officer of the Kish (central body of government) of the Zaporozhian Host in the 16th through 18th centuries.

Overview
The otaman was elected by a council of elder officers (the ) of the Zaporozhian Host. The position contained the highest military, administrative and judicial powers. Until the establishment of the Cossack Hetmanate, the title was interchangeably used with Hetman. A Kish otaman was elected for a term of one year and in exceptional cases was reelected. Upon expiration of his term amounted to report on his activities to a military council. The Kish otaman that was not re-elected, returned to his assigned '.

The last Kish otaman Petro Kalnyshevsky was re-elected ten years in a row, until the liquidation of Zaporozhian Sich in 1775.

Duties
 Open military councils (circle)
 Headed starshyna councils
 Enter diplomatic relationships with foreign countries
 Distribute military trophies
 Distribute profit from customs
 Legitimize the division of pastures, estates, and land for hunting and fishing
 Confirm the  elected by the Sich council
 Appointed palanka and other starshynas and sometimes military servicemen
 Acting as supreme judge asserted the sentences made by a Kish judge
 Accepted clergymen from Kiev and appointed priests to the churches of Sich and palankas

Among most famous Koshovyi otamans were Ivan Pidkova, Ivan Sirko, Petro Kalnyshevsky. There were at least 30 Kish Otamans in the history of Zaporizhian Sich before its collapse in 1775. Nothing is known about the Kish Otamans of Tomak Sich, Bezlavuk Sich, and Mykytyn Rih Sich. The longest standing Sich was the Chortomlyk Sich of which most of information has survived. After the defeat at the battle of Poltava and the Sich raid Kost Hordiyenko transferred the Sich downstream along Dnieper to the old settlement of Oleshky in 1709, which was part of Ottoman Empire. It took some 25 years before the Russian government allowed for Cossacks to return to re-establish the New Sich by Ivan Malashevych. With the destruction of Sich in 1775 Zaporizhian Cossacks have moved to Danube Delta.

References

External links
Kish Otoman in the Encyclopedia 

 
Military ranks of Ukraine

Zaporozhian Host
Zaporozhian Cossacks
Early Modern history of Ukraine
History of the Cossacks in Ukraine
Zaporizhian Sich